The 2021–22 Turkish Cup was the 60th season of the tournament. Ziraat Bankası was the sponsor of the tournament, thus the sponsored name is Ziraat Turkish Cup. The winners earned a berth in the play-off round of the 2022–23 UEFA Europa League, and also qualify for the 2022 Turkish Super Cup.

Competition format 

Source:

First round
10 Third League teams competed in this round. No seeds were applied in the single-leg round. The draw was made on 25 August 2021. The match schedules were announced on 29 August 2021. 2 seeded and 3 unseeded teams qualified for the next round. Biggest upset was Kuşadasıspor (133) eliminating Modafen (128). Lowest-ranked team qualifying for the next round was Kuşadasıspor (133). Highest-ranked team eliminated was Siirt İl Özel İdare (124).

Source:

Second round 
50 Third League teams competed in this round. No seeds were applied in the single-leg round. The draw was made on 15 September 2021. The match schedules were announced on 17 September 2021. 7 seeded and 18 unseeded teams qualified for the next round. Biggest upset was Kahta 02 Spor (125) eliminating Hacettepe Spor (82). Lowest-ranked team qualifying for the next round was Iğdır Futbol Kulübü (130). Highest-ranked team eliminated was Gümüşhanespor (79).

Source:

Third round 
5 Super League, 19 First League, 39 Second League and 25 Third League teams competed in this round. Seeds were applied in the single-leg round. Seeded teams played at home. The draw was made on 1 October 2021. The match schedules were announced on 8 October 2021. Kastamonuspor, which did not participate in the Ziraat Turkish Cup due to the negative effects of the flood disaster in Kastamonu, did not take part in the draw, while Giresunspor, which was matched with Kastamonuspor, automatically qualified for the next round. 32 seeded and 11 unseeded teams qualified for the next round. Biggest upset was Iğdır Futbol Kulübü (130) eliminating Eskişehirspor (42). Lowest-ranked team qualifying for the next round was Iğdır Futbol Kulübü (130). Highest-ranked team eliminated was BB Erzurumspor (21).

Source:

Fourth round 
15 Süper Lig, 15 First League, 15 Second League and 9 Third League teams compete in this round. Seeds were applied in the single-leg round. Seeded teams played at home. The draw was made on 2 November 2021. The match schedules were announced on 12 November 2021. 21 seeded and 6 unseeded teams qualified for the next round. Biggest upset was Mardin 1969 Spor (103) eliminating Gençlerbirliği (23). Lowest-ranked team qualifying for the next round was Mardin 1969 Spor (103). Highest-ranked team eliminated was Başakşehir FK (12).

Source:

Bracket

Fifth round 
18 Süper Lig, 9 First League, 3 Second League and 2 Third League teams compete in this round. Seeds were applied in the single-leg round. Seeded teams played at home. The draw was made on 3 December 2021. The match schedules were announced on 9 December 2021. 14 seeded and 2 unseeded teams qualified for the next round. Biggest upset was Denizlispor (24) eliminating Galatasaray (2). Lowest-ranked team qualifying for the next round was Bandırmaspor (32). Highest-ranked team eliminated was Galatasaray (2).

Source:

Round of 16 
14 Süper Lig and 2 First League teams compete in this round. Seeds were applied in the single-leg round. The draw was made on 14 January 2022. The match schedules were announced on 20 January 2022. 6 seeded and 2 unseeded teams qualified for the next round. Biggest upset was Kayserispor (17) eliminating Fenerbahçe (3). Lowest-ranked team qualifying for the next round was Kayserispor (17). Highest-ranked team eliminated was Fenerbahçe (3).

Source:

Quarter-finals 
8 Super League teams competed in this round. Seeds were applied in the single-leg round. The draw was made on 11 February 2022. The match schedules were announced on 16 February 2022.

Teams

Results

Semi-finals 
The match schedules for the first leg were announced on 19 March 2022. The match schedules for the second leg were announced on 28 April 2022.

Summary table

|-

|}

First leg

Second leg

Final 

The final match schedule and location were announced on 4 April 2022.

Top scorers 

Source:

Seedings 

Source:

External links
 Ziraat Turkish Cup – tff.org

References 

Turkish Cup seasons
Turkish Cup
Cup